David Sharp or Dave Sharp may refer to:

Dave Sharp (bass guitarist), American, touring musician for the Melvins
Dave Sharp (born 1959), English guitarist
David Sharp (cyclist) (born 1941), American Olympic cyclist
David Sharp (entomologist) (1840–1922), British entomologist
David Sharp (mountaineer) (1972–2006), English mountaineer

See also 
David Sharpe (disambiguation)